A blimp is an airship without an internal supporting framework or keel.

Blimp may also refer to:
 A barrage balloon, a balloon used to support a steel cable as an anti-aircraft measure
 The Blimp, a rock band formed in Glasgow, Scotland, in 1998
 Blimp Levy (c. 1903 – 1961), a professional wrestler
 Blimp, a large, hollow windscreen put on a microphone to cut wind noise
 The Blimp, member of parody superhero team the Inferior Five
 "The Blimp (mousetrapreplica)", song from the album Trout Mask Replica (1969) by Captain Beefheart

See also
 Colonel Blimp (disambiguation)